The Austin Aquarium is a for profit aquarium located in Austin, Texas, United States, that opened to the public December 12, 2013 and includes birds, fish and other amphibians. The aquarium is owned and operated by Crysty Covino the wife of former owner Ammon Covino.

History

The Austin Aquarium was founded by brothers Ammon and Vince Covino. 
There was controversy leading up to its opening based on their history in other cities, and the Covinos were issued a citation from the city in July 2013 for keeping animals at the site without a permit, and animal-rights group PETA called for the aquarium to receive a full inspection.

See also

San Antonio Aquarium
SeaQuest Interactive Aquariums

References

External links

Tourist attractions in Austin, Texas
Culture of Austin, Texas
Buildings and structures in Austin, Texas
Aquaria in Texas
2013 establishments in Texas
Buildings and structures in Williamson County, Texas